Warkworth is a town on the Northland Peninsula in the upper North Island of New Zealand. It is in the northern part of the Auckland Region.

The Warkworth district is known as the Kowhai Coast, named after the native kōwhai tree, and the town's annual Kowhai Festival is one of the largest community festivals in the country, running for around a week in spring.

From 2018 Warkworth is served by hourly buses to Hibiscus Coast Station and less frequent buses to Snells Beach, Algies Bay, Matakana, Omaha and Point Wells. InterCity buses run through Warkworth from Auckland to Kerikeri and Mahu City Express twice a day to Auckland.

Warkworth Museum, a local museum showcasing local history, opened in 1979.

Geography
Warkworth is located on the Mahurangi River at the point where it runs over a low waterfall and becomes a tidal estuary, which flows on into the Mahurangi Harbour. This is also the highest navigable point on the river, and the town's central business district is adjacent to the town wharf. 

On the eastern side of the river is the Mahurangi East peninsula, with the seaside towns of Snells Beach and Algies Bay. It is here that the scenic Kawau Island is found, notable for its historic Mansion House, once the private retreat of Governor Grey.

East of Warkworth and north of Mahurangi East lies the Tawharanui Peninsula, home of the Tawharanui Regional Park and Tawharanui Marine Park. To the north is the town of Wellsford, with the thickly forested Dome Valley lying in between. On the west coast lies the Kaipara Harbour, while to the south is the small historic township of Puhoi and further south the larger town of Orewa.

History

The location of Warkworth was known by Māori as Puhinui, and the waterfall is known as Puhinui Falls.

Warkworth, previously known as Browns Mill, was founded in 1853 by John Anderson Brown (born Newcastle upon Tyne), who first settled in the area in 1843. He named it after the village of Warkworth, Northumberland, where one of his relatives had taught for many years. In 1853 the government finished surveying the district and began to offer the land for sale. John Anderson Brown purchased  of land and his daughter Amelia purchased a further . He then surveyed the land into allotments where the well known streets such as Lilburn, Alnwick, Neville, and Bertram were named. Six months later in May 1854 the allotments were offered for sale in The New Zealander, an Auckland newspaper. Bridge House Lodge, established on the site of John Anderson Brown's home next door to the Warkworth Bridge, is the oldest surviving building in Warkworth. Early industry included logging of kauri and other timbers, flour milling and boat-building.

The first portland cement manufacturing works in the southern hemisphere, Wilson's Cement Company, was established near the town in 1884. The company began when Nathaniel Wilson, who manufactured roche lime using local limestone, became interested in cement in 1883 and formed a company with his brothers John and James. By 1910, the cement company had become one of the major employer in Warkworth. In 1918, the company amalgamated with the New Zealand Portland Cement Company, who were based in Motu Matakohe – Limestone Island in Whangārei, and the operation was gradually moved to Whangārei, eventually closing entirely in 1929. The ruins still remain and the mine is now a popular local fresh water swimming hole.

In 1883 the Masonic Hall was built and up until 1911 served as a public hall until a dedicated building was constructed on the corner of Alnwick and Neville streets. Across the road on the opposite corner the new post office was built the same year and was furnished with a telephone exchange within 12 months of being open.

In 1922 Stubbs Butchery first opened and took over the site on Wharf Street that once housed Bowen's Store, the first commercial premises to be built in the 1860s.

During World War II, Warkworth was host to thousands of United States servicemen. There were 25 military camps which sprung up around the town's farmlands. They carried out exercises prior to being sent to the Pacific Campaigns, and were well-received by the community. The historic cement works, which had been closed since 1928, was used as demolition practice by the servicemen.

Local government

The first local government for the township was the Upper Mahurangi Highway District, which was formed on 24 December 1864. It was one of the first highway districts to form north of the city of Auckland, and was formed to administer the road upkeep costs in the area. With the abolition of the provinces of New Zealand in 1876, Warkworth became part of Rodney County, which was formed at that time. The highway district was dissolved in 1903, and by 1909 Warkworth had grown to the point where the Warkworth Town District was established, within Rodney County. From 1989 to 2010, Warkworth was part of Rodney District.

In November 2010, all city and district councils in the Auckland Region were merged into a single unitary authority, Auckland Council, with Warkworth in the Rodney Local Board area. Electors in Warkworth vote for the seven-member Rodney Local Board, and also a Rodney ward councillor, who represents the area on the Auckland Council.

Demographics

Warkworth had a population of 5,586 at the 2018 New Zealand census, an increase of 1,317 people (30.9%) since the 2013 census, and an increase of 2,124 people (61.4%) since the 2006 census. There were 2,085 households, comprising 2,709 males and 2,877 females, giving a sex ratio of 0.94 males per female, with 1,002 people (17.9%) aged under 15 years, 888 (15.9%) aged 15 to 29, 2,151 (38.5%) aged 30 to 64, and 1,545 (27.7%) aged 65 or older.

Ethnicities were 86.5% European/Pākehā, 9.3% Māori, 6.7% Pacific peoples, 5.6% Asian, and 1.8% other ethnicities. People may identify with more than one ethnicity.

The percentage of people born overseas was 27.4, compared with 27.1% nationally.

Although some people chose not to answer the census's question about religious affiliation, 48.5% had no religion, 40.0% were Christian, 0.7% had Māori religious beliefs, 1.1% were Hindu, 0.2% were Muslim, 0.5% were Buddhist and 1.8% had other religions.

Of those at least 15 years old, 816 (17.8%) people had a bachelor's or higher degree, and 843 (18.4%) people had no formal qualifications. 732 people (16.0%) earned over $70,000 compared to 17.2% nationally. The employment status of those at least 15 was that 1,980 (43.2%) people were employed full-time, 702 (15.3%) were part-time, and 81 (1.8%) were unemployed.

Climate
Köppen-Geiger climate classification system classifies its climate as oceanic (Cfb), but it is rainier in winter.

Education

Mahurangi College

Mahurangi College is a co-educational secondary school, teaching students between years 7–13 (form 1–7, grade 6–12), with a roll of  students as of  It was first built on the current site in 1957, and was then called Warkworth District High School. It was renamed Mahurangi College in 1962, and had a roll of 210 students at the time. Yacht designer Bruce Farr was among the first pupils. Mahurangi College first reached the 1,000 pupil milestone in 1998 and the school had an entire staff and pupil photograph taken. All Black Zinzan Brooke attended from form 1 in 1976 to the end of form 5 in 1980 and his brother and fellow All Black Robin Brooke attended from form 1 in 1978 until form 7 in 1984. Cricket twins Hamish Marshall and James Marshall, who represented New Zealand with the Black Caps Cricket Team, attended from form 1 in 1991 until form 6 in 1996 when they were offered a cricket scholarship to Kings College. Ruahei Demant, Black Fern and women's rugby World Player of the year in 2022, is an ex-pupil. A new auditorium was completed at the end of January 2011. In early January 2012, construction began on rebuilding B-block and a new administration centre. The renovations and constructions were completed mid-2013, and Associate Education Minister Nikki Kaye announced on 2 April 2015, that work would begin on a $6.3 million property upgrade at the College.

Warkworth School

Warkworth School is a co-educational primary (years 1–6) school with a roll of  students as of

Sports
Mahurangi RFC is the local rugby club, formed in 1989 as an amalgamation of three strong local rugby clubs: Warkworth, Kaipara Flats and Omaha. There was no formal College Rugby competition and the three Clubs competed against each other for players from the Mahurangi College to play in the Under 15, 16 and 17 age group competitions. The three clubs felt that this arrangement was unsatisfactory for youth development and this provided the impetus for a steering committee from all three clubs to investigate the possibility of amalgamation and to compete in the North Harbour Provincial Union.

Sister towns

Warkworth has several sister towns including:
Warkworth, Northumberland (Town founder John Anderson Brown named Warkworth after his former home in England)
Furudono, Fukushima (Furudono is a sister school of Mahurangi College and Warkworth Primary School located in Honshū, Japan)
Warkworth, Ontario (This town in Canada was sistered in 2003)

References

External links

Statistics New Zealand's profile of Warkworth (2001 Census)

Rodney Local Board Area
Populated places in the Auckland Region
Matakana Coast